Siederia listerella is a moth of the Psychidae family. It was described by Carl Linnaeus in 1758. It is found in most of Europe, except Ireland, Great Britain, the Iberian Peninsula and most of the Balkan Peninsula.

The wingspan is 11–15 mm. Adults have been recorded on wing from the end of May to the beginning of June.

References

 Siederia listerella in gbif

Moths described in 1758
Taxa named by Carl Linnaeus
Psychidae
Moths of Europe